The Parkview Historic District in New Orleans, Louisiana is a  historic district that was listed on the National Register of Historic Places (NRHP) in 1995.

The district included 1,349 buildings, 92 percent of which were deemed to be contributing buildings.  It includes the General Laundry Building and the Jean Marie Saux Building which are separately listed on the NRHP.

It consists of:
Shotgun Houses (520 - 39%) of both single shotgun and double-shotgun architecture
Bungalow (132 - 10%)
Raised Basement (218 - 16%)
Two-story Single Houses (100 - 7%), some with a one- or two-story porch
Two-Story Double Houses (170 - 13%)
Commercial (110 - 8%)
Institutional (7 - 1/2 percent), almost all being school buildings
Other (92 - 7%).

References

Colonial Revival architecture in Louisiana
Italianate architecture in Louisiana
Historic districts on the National Register of Historic Places in Louisiana
National Register of Historic Places in New Orleans